Recycled is the sixth album from English progressive rock band Nektar. It is a concept album addressing the band members' concerns about the environment. There are only two songs on the album, one for each side, titled simply "Part One" and "Part Two". "Part One" tells the tale of a nightmarish future in which only "recycled energy" remains, while "Part Two" revolves around more present-day concerns about tourism despoiling untouched wilderness.

Reception

Allmusic gave the album a mixed retrospective review. They criticized the album as lacking the instrumental prowess, enthusiasm, and band cohesion that the players had shown on Nektar's previous albums. However, they acknowledged that "What does hold strong is Nektar's ability to conjure up a science-fiction atmosphere through the unorthodox application of percussion, guitar, and keyboards."

Track listing
All songs written and arranged by Nektar.

Credits
Roye Albrighton - lead vocals, guitars
Mick Brockett - visual environment
Alan "Taff" Freeman - keyboards, backing vocals
Ron Howden - drums, percussion
Derek "Mo" Moore - bass, backing vocals

Additional personnel
Larry Fast - Moog synthesizer
The English Chorale conducted by Robert Howes, arranged by Christian Kolonovits

References

External links
 Recycled at TheNektarProject.com

1976 albums
Nektar albums